George and Ashley Abraham (George Dixon Abraham, FRPS, 7 October 1871 – 4 March 1965; Ashley Perry Abraham, 20 February 1876 – 9 October 1951), sometimes referred to as "The Keswick Brothers",  were climbers, authors and photographers who lived in Keswick, Cumberland in the English Lake District. They made a photographic record of the exploits of many of the climbing pioneers, especially Owen Glynne Jones, with whom they formed a close climbing partnership from 1896 until his death in 1899. Most of their work was done between 1890 and 1920 and forms a valuable record of the evolution of early rock-climbing in the English Lake District.

Early life
They were the two eldest of four sons of George Perry Abraham (1844–1923), a photographer, postcard publisher, and mountaineer, and his wife Mary Dixon. Their brother Sidney was a bank manager in Keswick, and brother John Abraham became acting Governor of Tanganyika.

Rock climbing

One of their many first ascents in the Lakes was the 74 m "Keswick Brothers' Climb" on Scafell crag on 12 July 1897, now considered "Very Difficult" in the British grading system. Another memorable first ascent was of "Crowberry Ridge Direct" (graded "Severe") on the Scottish Munro Buachaille Etive Mor in 1900.

After their co-operation with Jones in his very successful Rock Climbing in the English Lake District (1897), they produced companion volumes, Rock Climbing in North Wales (George, in 1906) and Rock Climbing in Skye (Ashley, in 1907). These attempted to emulate Jones' exuberant style, and were of course illustrated with their own photographs.

Throughout their career the brothers' camera of choice was the Underwood Instanto, which recorded images on 8.5 x 6.5 inch photographic plates. Many of their climbing photographs, (including the classic portrait of Owen Glynne Jones), were reproduced in Alan Hankinson's Camera on the Crags. A large selection is also in the possession of the FRCC (The Fell and Rock Climbing Club of the English Lake District), of which the brothers were founding members and Ashley its first president.

The Abrahams' photographic shop in Keswick, built in 1887, was taken over in due course by local mountaineer George Fisher; the modern shop still contains many memorabilia, including photographs, from the Abrahams' era.

Publications

Mountaineering

Books

Articles

Tourism

Books
 

 

 

 

  (Undated)

Miscellaneous

Articles

See also

 M. J. B. Baddeley - a leading writer of a Lakes guidebook in the older, text-based style.
 W. A. Poucher - who further developed the Abrahams' style of highly-illustrated guides.

Notes

References

 A. Phizacklea (1996), Scafell, Wasdale & Eskdale, Fell and Rock Climbing Club of the English Lake District.

Further reading

 

British rock climbers
English mountain climbers
Landscape photographers
People from Keswick, Cumbria
Photography in the United Kingdom